Sean Reck (born 5 May 1967) is an English former professional footballer who played as a midfielder.

Career

Reck started his career at Oxford United, where he was loaned out to Newport County and Reading.

After leaving Oxford, he went to Wrexham and Cheltenham Town, retiring at the latter.

References

Living people
English Football League players
Oxford United F.C. players
Newport County A.F.C. players
Reading F.C. players
Wrexham A.F.C. players
Cheltenham Town F.C. players
Footballers from Oxford
1967 births
Association football midfielders
English footballers